Some cases have been remarkable for starting broad discussion and for setting precedent in medical ethics.

Research

Termination of mechanical ventilation and life support

Withholding life-prolonging medical treatment

Informed consent to medical treatment

Person wishes for assisted suicide

Person wishes for euthanasia for another

References

Medical ethics
Lists of lawsuits